Outwitted may refer to:

 Outwitted (1917 film), an American silent drama film directed by George D. Baker
 Outwitted (1925 film), an American silent drama film directed by J. P. McGowan